Isla Pardo, is an island in the Gulf of California east of the Baja California Peninsula. The island is uninhabited and is part of the Loreto Municipality.

Biology
Isla Pardo has four species of reptiles: Crotalus enyo (Baja California rattlesnake), Phyllodactylus nocticolus (peninsular leaf-toed gecko), Sauromalus ater (common chuckwalla), and Urosaurus nigricauda (black-tailed brush lizard).

References

Further reading

Islands of the Gulf of California
Islands of Baja California Sur
Loreto Municipality (Baja California Sur)
Uninhabited islands of Mexico